Carlee is the feminine form of Carl or Charles and is derived from the Old English word “ceorl,” meaning “free man.”

Given name
Carlee Beattie (born 1982), Australian Paralympic athlete 
Carlee Campbell (born 1988), Canadian ice hockey player
Carlee Hoffman (born 1986), American wheelchair basketball player
Carlee Taylor (born 1989), Australian cyclist

See also

Carl Lee (disambiguation)
Carle, surnames
Carle (given name)
Carleen (given name)
Carlen (surname)
Carlene (name)
Carles (disambiguation)
Carley (name)
Caylee
Karlee

Feminine given names